Counter Terrorist Special Forces: Fire for Effect, known in North America as Special Forces: Nemesis Strike, is a third-person shooter video game by Asobo Studio for Microsoft Windows and Xbox. Players play as a counter-terrorism agency. The main objective is to dismantle the Nemesis network and get back stolen technology. It is the fourth game in the CT Special Forces series.

Plot

The player plays as either two of the Counter Terrorist Special Forces (CTSF) elite agents; 'Stealth' Owl or 'Immortal' Raptor. They are both at best in stealth and frontal assault tactics respectively to complete their mission.

The game begins with a speech by the World Council President speaking to senators in regard to the CTSF and their work. It appears that the CTSF has an artificial intelligence unit and it has contributed to the many successes of the CTSF in fighting terrorism. Thanks to the Proteus Project that the council had voted for an artificial intelligence unit, Thesis, the CTSF's AI has been baptised to serve the CTSF with its fight against terrorism, with 90% accuracy and no news of terrorist attacks in the last six months. General Banner, the former general now serving the CTSF, gives thanks. It is then seen that due to the geopolitical climate no longer steady, the council has voted that Thesis be reassigned to military research, which exasperates Banner. He is told to relax and is told of the plans, which he does not seem happy on.

Back in Antarctica, the CTSF base has training carried out. Owl is handling his recruits when then he and Raptor are called in by Tracy, the head in communications, for officer's evaluation. The player is then taught, in two missions on how to use the interfaces with Raptor or Owl.

Soon after Banner returns, three simultaneous attacks are alerted. A tanker is hijacked and a train is bombarded, both by terrorists. Raptor handles the tanker while Owl handles the train. However the terrorists succeed in the third attack where they blew a dam and flooded the city of Kiev. Raptor is first sent in to clear the numerous patrol boats with terrorists and then save a civilian. Owl then parachutes down, going to handle the terrorists and their plan to destroy the city. Owl finishes most of them off, until a chopper comes in and attacks. Owl heads to a stadium where Raptor is waiting and Raptor takes care of the chopper with his Hoverspeed.

The terrorist threat isn't over yet, as Tracy, back in headquarters points out that the terrorists have escaped to Russia, with a heavy transportation of arms carried out. Raptor heads to an unused dock where the terrorists are located and finishes the choppers escaping, with a heavy frontal assault attack using the element of surprise. However, upon clearing the place, it is then found out that the mission was to be aborted as the terrorists have suddenly gained an upper hand, where they succeeded taking control of a missile launch base, threatening to fire a nuclear missile. Raptor is then extracted while Owl continues in stealth. Somehow, when Owl arrives in the control room, the missile has been triggered to fire, and he is told to look for the scientists who can stop the bomb. They arrive swiftly, stopping the launch sequence.

The terrorists escape to the Middle East where they have fortified a base. Owl is sent in by a stealth drop while Raptor is sent in for a ground intervention. Owl first locates a terminal and allows the CTSF access to the base. Owl then plants charges on gun posts and rigs them to explode just as Raptor then arrives to pick him up.

The terrorists then secure an unused bunker and the CTSF retaliates. Raptor first handles anti-aircraft guns where owl then is dropped in stealth. However, the terrorists somehow manage to block Thesis from overseeing the base of operations so Owl goes in blind. He ends up, wounded from an explosion, hearing the leader of the terrorists just before he was injured from.

Owl recuperates, while Banner is angry at what the terrorists are doing. Just as well, the terrorists are found in a jungle, where Raptor is sent in to take them down. Securing the jungle, Raptor finds a bunker, where he estimates that there are too many enemies for him to hold. He requests for help, which Banner, ironically sends Owl, though still in need of recuperation. He arrives at the spot, to Raptor's shock and takes over. It is then found out of the bunker; it is the base of the Nemesis Organisation (NO), where the ex-CTSF scientist Gregory Statszeck is found. Owl then tries to get him back, and they also succeed extracting data from the NO's AI, Nemesis. Raptor then arrives to pick them up.

Banner informs Raptor, Owl and Tracy of his latest find; NO has set a task for the CTSF, where they have held hostage of the CTSF's senators and will publicly execute them in 3 hours, doing so would result in the end of the CTSF. The three of them are shocked, but are determined to finish things off. Owl goes down in stealth, though on the ground Thesis is blocked off again, where Owl later enables contact via morse and saves the senators.

While back in Antarctica, the NO has begun attack on the CTSF base. Everyone is panicked. Owl receives a call while returning, which he is informed by Tracy to extract all of Thesis' data. A huge bomb is also fired down towards the base. Owl parachutes down and disarms the bomb, where on the ground he carries out his orders.

Unfortunately Banner enters and suspects Owl for betraying the CTSF. When the others find out, Raptor was shocked. Owl tries to prove his innocence, which was partly supported by the terrorists' action which the communications were disrupted. Owl is sent into detainment while Raptor goes out to secure the base and reprogram the communications. He later finds the leader and tells Tracy to release Owl and group with him.

The leader turns out to be none other than Owl's previous partner, Anton Call. Call wants revenge on the CTSF, which he almost succeeds. Owl seemed reluctant on shooting his former partner, until he and Raptor go on a chase to stop Call. They succeed, and Banner apologises to Owl for doubting him. Banner also recalls his late soldiers whose bravery he will not forget, and senses pride he has with the CTSF.

Gameplay
The game is played in a third person point of view, though interchangeable into a first person perspective but is more of a 'scope' view of the current weapon on hand. Guns with no scopes are given a close up view by the barrel top, while weapons with scopes are given the scoped view.

Like most shooter games, there is a life gauge on the top left corner, primarily a health bar indicating the amount of health available. In addition, there is another bar for energy of the suit worn. When playing as Raptor, his 'TAMSS' suit gives a spherical protection shield that blocks off any bullet or explosion, though it cannot block melee attacks from enemies. Any impact on the shield drains the energy bar while keeping the player safe. When playing as Owl, his 'Vampyr's Heart' suit enables his active camouflage and three specific visions, which any, when activated drains the energy bar while giving the player usage to the suit's functions; the bar however does not drain faster when multiple applications of the suit is in use. Players can recharge the energy bars from a special recharge battery booth marked as a blue dot on the minimap. There are also health kits throughout each missions' map, seen as a spinning health box.

The weapons in use depend on the current mission played. When playing as Raptor, heavy guns, explosives and automatic firearms are used in a frontal assault tactic. When playing as Owl, silenced guns, semi-automatic guns and scope rifles are used in stealth; though in the last few missions, Owl does not fully use stealth firearms. Ammunition packs are seen as spinning black coloured-trimmed boxes; small yellow packs for bullets, big orange packs for explosives, small cubic orange packs for grenades and flat blue packs for electromagnetic grenades.

When driving vehicles, both characters can drive any vehicle, ranging from boats to jeeps. The Hoverspeed is a massive vehicle only Raptor can drive which enables access to any terrain, also mounting a machine gun that can be controlled alone or when Owl is on board. Driving a vehicle is relatively easy that only requires the basic movement controls.

A free-fall mode is available when players play as Owl in a drop mission. When in free-fall, the player can speed up and attain streamlined body which enables quicker reach to the required height while leaving Owl vulnerable to attacks, or looping in free-fall to dodge any shots fired by enemies. A drop mission has enemies who are also in the sky with Owl as they gun him down, which the player can engage in combat up in free-fall. In later levels, locked-on missiles are launched which can be destroyed if detected and destroyed quickly, extreme enemy parachutists jumping onto Owl to kill him in mid-air which can be tackled when in all directions quickly, and lastly multiple missiles launched at Owl where destroying and dodging is imminent to survive. In the last few levels Owl also destroys a bomb in mid-air where the player simply shoots at designated spots. A time limit is given, also with a huge amount of ammunition.

The game also has a score card on the performance of the player. The score determines the medal won and, if any, special bonuses unlocked. The game grades of bronze, silver and gold medals for every mission completed, and if done specifically well, wins the Emblem award, which unlocks special bonuses in the game such as game art or even cheat modes. Winning awards also come with extra bonuses that can be used in game, like additional health or energy depending on the award won.

External links 
 

2005 video games
PlayStation 2 games
Third-person shooters
Video game sequels
Video games about terrorism
Video games developed in France
Windows games
Xbox games
Asobo Studio games
Single-player video games